An Lac or An Lạc in Vietnamese may refer to:

 Ward An Lạc, Bình Tân, Bình Tân District, Ho Chi Minh City
 Ward An Lạc, Ninh Kiều, Ninh Kiều District, Cần Thơ
 Ward An Lạc, Đắk Lắk, Buôn Hồ town, Đắk Lắk Province
 Ward An Lạc, Đồng Tháp, Hồng Ngự town, Đồng Tháp Province
 Communes An Lạc, Hải Dương, Chí Linh District, Hải Dương Province
 Commune An Lạc, Cao Bằng, Hạ Lang District, Cao Bằng Province
 Commune An Lạc, Hòa Bình, Lạc Thuỷ District, Hòa Bình Province
 Commune An Lạc, Yên Bái, Luc Yen District, Yên Bái Province
 Commune An Lạc, Bắc Giang, Sơn Động District, Bắc Giang Province
 Commune An Lạc, Tri Tôn, Tri Tôn District, an Giang Province

See also
 Ward An Lạc A, Bình Tân District, Ho Chi Minh City
 Communes An Lạc Tây, Kế Sách, Kế Sách District, Sóc Trăng Province
 Communes An Lạc Thôn, Kế Sách, Kế Sách District, Sóc Trăng Province